Alexander Spence may refer to:

 Alexander Spence (soldier) (1906–1983), Australian soldier
 Skip Spence (1946–1999), Canadian musician